Richard Quinn may refer to:

Richard Quinn (American football) (born 1986), American football tight end
Richard Quinn (athlete) (1882–?), British track and field athlete
Richard Quinn (designer) (born 1990), British fashion and print designer
Richard Quinn (jockey) (born 1961), Scottish jockey
Richard Quinn (political consultant), Republican consultant from South Carolina
Richard Quinn (born c. 1987), one of the Quinn brothers, killed in Northern Ireland, in 1998

See also
 Richard Quine